Nangō may refer to the following places in Miyazaki Prefecture, Japan:
Nangō, Miyazaki (Higashiusuki), a former village in Higashiusuki District
Nangō, Miyazaki (Minaminaka), a town in Minaminaka District